Attila was a heavy metal band from New York City active between 1983 and 1986. The group released their sole full-length album, Rolling Thunder, in 1986 on Shattered Records. The group also donated the track "Lucifer's Hammer" to the 1985 compilation album Speed Metal Hell Vol. 1. They also appeared on the Mausoleum Records compilation Metal over America with the tracks "Interceptor" and "Urban Commandos".

After the breakup of the band, drummer Anthony "A.T. Soldier" Tedeschi became a firefighter and was captain of FDNY Squad 270.

Members 
Last known lineup:

 A.T. Soldier (Anthony Tedeschi)- Drums, backing vocals
 John DeLeon- Guitar
 Vincent Paul Manfredi- Bass, vocals (died 2017) 

Other known members:

 Mike Buccel- Bass
 Jim Bachi- Guitar

Discography 
Rolling Thunder (1986, Shattered)

References

 http://www.metalforcesmagazine.com/site/news-former-attila-frontman-vincent-paul-manfredi-dies-aged-53/

Heavy metal musical groups from New York (state)
Musical groups established in 1983
Musical groups disestablished in 1986